"What Do You Want from Me" is a single by the American band Forever the Sickest Kids. It is the first single from their EP The Weekend: Friday. It was first released on October 30, 2009 in the United States.

It has been featured in numerous Nerf commercials, and in the ending credits of the film Diary of a Wimpy Kid, where it was re-released with minor changes in the lyrics.

Song information
The Weekend: Friday, which featured the song, was released on November 17, 2009. However, the single was originally released on October 30, 2009 on the band's MySpace. A music video for the song was then soon released in December.

On March 19, 2010, the single was re-released for the film Diary of a Wimpy Kid, entitled "What Do You Want from Me (Diary of a Wimpy Kid Mix)". This version features slight changes in the lyrics from the original version, in order to make the song more kid-oriented.

The verse "I don't wanna waste my time again/By getting wasted with so-called friends", was changed to "I don't wanna waste my time again/By getting crazy with so-called friends".  The second verse, "And I've been thinking that we've been drinking in hopes to maintain our sanity", was changed to, "And I've been thinking that we've been sinking in hopes to maintain our sanity."

Music video
The music video for the song was released on December 14, 2009.

The band's manager (played by Verne Troyer) informs the band that they need a change in their image. The band is skeptical at first, but goes along with the idea. The manager has them perform their song in many different fashions, such as hip-hop, goth, and being dressed in neon colors, all of which fail among their audience. The band then decides to perform with their own, original style. When this finally gains the audience's approval, the manager claims to the band, "See? I told you guys. Just be yourself."

References

External links
Official Music Video at YouTube

2009 singles
2009 songs
Forever the Sickest Kids songs
Universal Republic Records singles
Songs written by Shep Goodman